Natalya Mamlina (born 16 March 1991) is a Russian female high jumper, who won an individual gold medal at the Youth World Championships.

References

External links

1991 births
Living people
Russian female high jumpers